Santos Reyes may refer to:

People
Santos Reyes (prisoner), an American prisoner
Arturo Santos Reyes (born 1985), a Mexican boxer

Places
Santos Reyes Nopala, Oaxaca, Mexico
Santos Reyes Pápalo, Oaxaca, Mexico
Santos Reyes Tepejillo, Oaxaca, Mexico
Santos Reyes Yucuná, Oaxaca, Mexico

Other uses
Los Santos Reyes, 1958 Mexican film

See also

Reyes, Bolivia